= Lev Kramarenko =

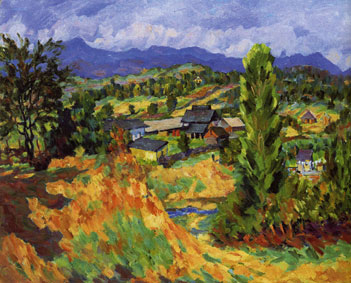
Painting.

Lev Yuriyovych Kramarenko (Ukrainian: Лев Юрійович Крамаренко; 25 January [O.S. 13 January] 1888 — 5 March 1942) was Ukrainian painter.
